EFORT Open Reviews is a monthly peer-reviewed medical journal, which was first published in January 2016. EFORT Open Reviews is the official journal of the European Federation of National Associations of Orthopaedics and Traumatology (EFORT) and is published in partnership with Bioscientifica. EFORT Open Reviews is a gold open access journal and hence articles published in the journal are available online to anyone, free of charge. Full-text content can also be accessed via PubMed Central.

Abstracting and indexing
The journal is indexed in PubMed Central, which hosts full-text content of the complete archive.

References

External links

English-language journals
Monthly journals
Orthopedics journals
Publications established in 2016